Millennium Hall may refer to:

Millenium Hall, or A Description of Millenium Hall and the Country Adjacent, a 1762 novel by Sarah Scott
 Millennium Hall, one of several buildings funded by the Millennium Commission to celebrate the turn of the millennium

See also

Millennium Centre (disambiguation)